Fabricator is the third studio album by BWO. It was released on September 19, 2007. It peaked at number 6 on the Swedish Albums Chart.

Track listing

Charts

References

External links
 

2007 albums
BWO (band) albums
EMI Music Sweden albums